Kurmach-Baygol (Kurmaç-Baygol) is a rural locality (a selo) and the administrative centre of Kurmach-Baygolskoye Rural Settlement of Turochaksky District, the Altai Republic, Russia. The population was 211 as of 2016. There are 2 streets.

Geography 
Kurmach-Baygol is located on the left bank of the Baygol River, 101 km southeast of Turochak (the district's administrative centre) by road. Biyka is the nearest rural locality.

References 

Rural localities in Turochaksky District